Virginia Transformer Corp is the fourth largest power transformer manufacturer in North America. The company supplies custom-made transformers to power generating and distributing companies, heavy industries and other businesses. The company has three manufacturing facilities in North America. The product range covers a wide range, from larger distribution transformers to large power transformers, rectifier and drive-duty transformers, and special transformers for a wide array of applications. However, it also designs generator and substation applications.

Key people
Prabhat Jain - President / CEO
Matthew Gregg - Vice President Operations (Roanoke & Pocatello Plants)
Subhas Sarkar - Technical Manager Development (Retired & part-time consultant) 
Tim Haggett - Chief Financial Officer
Mudassar Mohsin - Corporate Head of Human Resources 
Rakesh Rathi - VP Engineering & Materials

Locations
Roanoke, Virginia  (Corporate Office & Manufacturing Plant)
Troutville, Virginia (Manufacturing - Metal Fab Plant)
Pocatello, Idaho (Manufacturing Plant)
Rincon, Georgia (Manufacturing Plant)
Chihuahua, Mexico (Manufacturing Plant)
Delhi, India (Design, IT and Procurement Support Center)

Products
Liquid Filled
Automatic Load Tap Changing
Voltage Regulators
Dry Type
Uniclad
Repair and Refurbishment

External links
Official website
VTC Mexico Plant
Virginia Transformer Corp. Contact Information

Manufacturing companies based in Virginia